Quercus alba
Quercus aliena
Quercus bicolor
Quercus borealis (rubra)
Quercus borealis var. maxima (rubra)
Quercus cerris
Quercus coccinea
Quercus dentata
Quercus ellipsoidalis
Quercus faginea
Quercus frainetto
Quercus glandulifera
Quercus ilicifolia
Quercus ilex, Hardines Zone: 7 - 10, not hardy.
Quercus imbricaria
Quercus liaotungensis
Quercus macranthera
Quercus macrocarpa
Quercus mongolica
Quercus mongolica var. grosseserrata
Quercus montana (prinus)
Quercus palustris
Quercus petraea
Quercus petraea f. mespilifolia
Quercus petraea x robur (robur var. puberula)
Quercus pontica
Quercus pubescens
Quercus robur
Quercus robur 'Filicifolia'
Quercus robur f. fastigiata
Quercus robur var. tardissima
Quercus rubra
Quercus x schochiana
Quercus shumardii
Quercus suber, Hardines Zone: 8 - 10, not hardy.
Quercus x turneri 'Pseudoturneri'
Quercus velutina

See also
 Trees of the world
 List of Quercus species

References 

Flora of Denmark